The Barra do Garças air disaster was a suicide attack that occurred in Barra do Garças, Mato Grosso, Brazil, on June 1, 1980, when pilot Mauro Milhomem attempted to crash a single-engine aircraft into the Hotel Presidente owned by his mother-in-law, killing six persons and himself and wounding four others. This incident is possibly one of the first cases of suicide by pilot in Brazil.

Background
Prior to the crash, Milhomem had an argument with his wife after he determined that she had been unfaithful to him; Milhomem threatened to crash a plane into the hotel owned by his wife's mother.

Crash
On June 1, 1980, Milhomem, a pilot for the air taxi service Táxi Aereo Garapu, flew an Embraer EMB Sertanejo-721 single-engine airplane registered as PT-EGI with four passengers inside it to the Hotel Presidente where his wife was residing, and attempted to hit the hotel; he failed to control the aircraft and instead hit a tree, several utility poles, and ultimately a two-story building, and finally crashed into an accounting office.

In addition to Milhomem, three people died immediately; another died while being transported to Goiânia, and two more died within the two days following the crash. Four people were injured, two seriously, and were treated in a Barra do Garças hospital.

Aftermath
Initially Aldirio Oliveira Vieira, an official of the Brazilian airport authority Infraero, said that the plane had been flying at a low altitude around the building, struck a utility pole with its right wing rupturing its gasoline tank, hit a second pole, and then crashed into an accounting office. It was later determined that the pilot, Milhomem, had attempted unsuccessfully to execute a kamikaze-style attack on the hotel building which his mother-in-law owned.

Milhomem's wife, Angela Milhomem, allegedly committed suicide a few days after the crash.

See also
Connellan air disaster
Suicide by pilot
Kamikaze attack
List of rampage killers#Vehicular homicide

References

External links
Acidentes ocorrem mais com aparelhos pequenos, Folha de S.Paulo (May 26, 1982)

1980 in Brazil
Airliner accidents and incidents involving deliberate crashes
Aviation accidents and incidents in 1980
Mass murder in 1980
Murder–suicides in South America
June 1980 events in South America
1980 murders in Brazil